Nickelodeon Cultural Resort is a Chinese resort hotel and theme park that is potentially still under construction in Foshan, Guangdong. It will have an area of 250 acres. Groundbreaking took place on January 4, 2017 and was originally planned to open in 2020. The park is part of a  development, the Foshan Cultural and Ecological Coastal Project.

Concept artwork for the theme park showcases the themings for its seven areas: SpongeBob SquarePants, Teenage Mutant Ninja Turtles, Avatar: The Last Airbender, Paw Patrol, Dora the Explorer, a slime-themed entrance area, and an area that combines Danny Phantom, Invader Zim, The Fairly OddParents, Rugrats, and Jimmy Neutron.

While construction for Nickelodeon Universe's Mall of China (Chongqing, China) location was briefly paused due to the COVID-19 pandemic, the construction status of the Nickelodeon Cultural Resort in Foshan is currently unknown.

References

Amusement parks in China
Buildings and structures in Foshan
Cultural Resort
Buildings and structures under construction in China
2017 establishments in China